Mamta Kumari Chaudhary is a Nepali cricketer and Middle-order batswoman of Nepali National Cricket team. Her first time representing Nepal in an international level was in the ACC T20 Women's Tournament on 29 October 2012, playing against China. She has also played in the 2014 Asian Games and 2016 Women's Twenty20 Asia Cup as a part of the Nepal women's national cricket team.

References

External links
 

Living people
Nepalese women cricketers
Cricketers at the 2014 Asian Games
1991 births
Asian Games competitors for Nepal
Nepal women Twenty20 International cricketers
South Asian Games bronze medalists for Nepal
South Asian Games medalists in cricket